Oregon Route 78 is an Oregon state highway running from Burns in Harney County to Burns Junction in Malheur County. OR 78 is known as the Steens Highway No. 442 (see Oregon highways and routes).

Route description 
OR 78 begins at an intersection with US 20 and US 395 in Burns and continues southeast through Crane and New Princeton to Burns Junction, where it ends at an intersection with US 95.

History 
OR 78 was assigned to the Burns-Crane Highway No. 24 when the Oregon route numbering system was initiated in 1932.

Major intersections

References 

078
Transportation in Harney County, Oregon
Transportation in Malheur County, Oregon